Berau may refer to:

Indonesia
Berau Regency, a regency in East Kalimantan, Indonesia
Berau Sultanate, in the area of the Berau Regency
Berau Malays or Berau people, an ethnic group in East Kalimantan
Berau Malay language, language spoken by the Berau people in East Kalimantan

elsewhere
Mountains Bera Bach and Bera Mawr in North Wales — the pair is called 'the Berau'